The Texas Southern Railway, now defunct, was an American shortline railroad based in Marshall, Texas.

History 
The Texas Southern Railway was charted on March 12, 1897 to take over the Paris, Marshall and Sabine Pass Railway. The railway only extended from Marshall to a small community called Harleton. It was soon decided to extended the railway west towards Winnsboro, Texas. To do so, the Texas Southern began purchasing many smaller logging trams near Gilmer and Winnsboro. The Commercial Lumber Company out of Gilmer was purchased in 1897 by the Texas Southern. Out of the original 16 miles of line created by the Commercial Lumber Company, only three miles were used. The rest of the line was deemed too steep and sharp to be of use. After Gilmer, the railway continued construction to Winnsboro. Many communities combined together when the railway came through. This led to the founding of Kelsey, Rosewood, and Rhonesboro, Texas. In 1901, the Texas Southern reached Winnsboro where it connected with the Missouri, Kansas, and Texas Railroad. On June 15, 1902, the first passenger train operated over the entire line.  In 1904, the railway owned 73.7 miles of track between Marshall and Winnsboro. 1902 to 1904 were the best years on the railway. Despite many good comings, the railway soon found itself in financial straits. Eventually, the company folded and was sold to the Marshall and East Texas Railway on August 17, 1908.

References 

Railway lines opened in 1897
Railway lines closed in 1908